Llawr y Glyn (or Llawryglyn) is a hamlet in Powys, Wales. It lies about 10 miles west of the town of Newtown, in the historic county of Montgomeryshire. It has changed very little over the passage of time, as it is primarily an agricultural community.

External links 
Photos of Llawryglyn and surrounding area on geograph

Villages in Powys